Torkil Lauritzen  (18 June 1901 – 4 June 1979) was a Danish actor.

Selected filmography 
 Vester Vov-Vov – 1927
 Kraft og skønhed – 1928
 Hallo! Afrika forude! – 1929
 En fuldendt gentleman – 1937
 Frøken Møllers jubilæum – 1937
 Der var engang en vicevært – 1937
 Alarm – 1938
 Blaavand melder storm – 1938
 Champagnegaloppen – 1938
 Nordhavets mænd – 1939
 Pas på svinget i Solby – 1940
 Jeg har elsket og levet – 1940
 Sommerglæder – 1940
 Søren Søndervold – 1942
 Besættelse – 1944
 Ta', hvad du vil ha' – 1947
 For frihed og ret – 1949
 Kampen mod uretten – 1949
 Frihed forpligter – 1951
 Hold fingrene fra mor – 1951
 Vi arme syndere – 1952
 Fløjtespilleren – 1953
 Himlen er blå – 1954
 En sømand går i land – 1954
 Tre finder en kro – 1955
 Taxa K-1640 Efterlyses – 1955
 Vagabonderne på Bakkegården – 1958
 Lyssky transport gennem Danmark – 1958
 Pigen i søgelyset – 1959
 Cirkus Buster – 1961
 Støvsugerbanden – 1963
 Nyhavns glade gutter – 1967
 Rend mig i revolutionen – 1970

References

External links 
 
 
 

Danish male film actors
Danish male silent film actors
1901 births
1979 deaths
People from Frederiksberg
20th-century Danish male actors